Runemasters is a tabletop role-playing game supplement for RuneQuest. Originally published by Chaosium in 1980, it was republished in 2017 in PDF format as part of Chaosium's RuneQuest: Classic Edition Kickstarter.

Contents
Runemasters is a supplement for RuneQuest, that includes rules for creating and playing rune masters. RuneMasters describes in detail 45 powerful rune-level NPCs from the cults in Cults of Prax.  The book also includes guidelines on how to create and run high-level characters.

Publication history
RuneMasters was written by William R. Keyes, with art by Luise Perenne, and was published by Chaosium in 1980 as a 48-page book.

Reception
Forrest Johnson reviewed Runemasters in The Space Gamer No. 33. Johnson commented that "Many GMs prefer to create their own NPCs, but this is a time saver."

Oliver Macdonald reviewed Runemasters for White Dwarf #25, giving it an overall rating of 9 out of 10, and stated that "In all RuneMasters contains a lot of useful material and would be well worth the cost to any GM as long as they use the Cults of Prax. Obviously drawing, as it does, such a lot of material from this book its usefulness is greatly reduced otherwise."

John T. Sapienza, Jr. reviewed Rune Masters for Different Worlds magazine and stated that "The value of this volume is in its advice on how to play RQ with tactical skill taught by a master. This is delightful book - highly recommended."

Reviews
 The Dungeoneers Journal (Issue 25 - Feb/Mar 1981)

References

External links
 
 RuneQuest: Classic Edition Kickstarter

Role-playing game supplements introduced in 1980
RuneQuest 2nd edition supplements